Apocalypto: Original Score is the soundtrack to the 2006 film of the same name by Mel Gibson. It was released on the Hollywood Records label.

Production 

The music is composed by James Horner and features vocals by Pakistani singer Rahat Nusrat Fateh Ali Khan and English musician Terry Edwards. The Apocalypto soundtrack is Horner's third time collaborating with Gibson. Horner had previously composed the score for Gibson's 1993 The Man Without a Face and his 1995 epic film Braveheart.

Straying away from his repertoire of orchestral music, Horner's mainly improvised Apocalypto soundtrack makes use of a large array of exotic instruments, such as the Tromba Marina, Swedish bark trumpets and the usage of Ugandan wildebeest horns in addition to synth pads. The soundtrack was recorded at London's Abbey Road Studios  over the course of several weeks during the fall of 2006.

Woodwind specialist Tony Hinnigan also contributed to the film score, borrowing numerous instruments from the New Globe Theatre and assembling the music crew.

Gibson described Khan’s vocal contribution to the score:
“He’s a valuable asset to our soundtrack. His dulcet tones add emotion and drama, and we have a very narrow palette as far as orchestra. We don’t have an orchestra so he is fulfilling a lot of the functions that would usually be supplied by the use of a full orchestra. Just all in one man; he’s a one-man band.”

Track listing

References 

James Horner albums
2006 soundtrack albums
Hollywood Records soundtracks
Film scores
Adventure film soundtracks